Andrea Chen (born 20 November 1987) is a Taiwanese actress and model. She graduated from National Taiwan University.

Chen has been dubbed "Little Vivian Chow" by the Taiwanese media due to her resemblance to the Hong Kong actress and singer.

She started her career as a commercial model and appeared in music videos before embarking on an acting career. She made her acting debut in 2011 starring as the second lead actress in the popular television series In Time with You, playing the role of Maggie.

Filmography

Television series

Film

Music video appearances

References

External links 

 
 
 

21st-century Taiwanese actresses
Taiwanese television actresses
Living people
Taiwanese female models
National Taiwan University alumni
1987 births
Actresses from Taipei